Acrocercops stalagmitis is a moth of the family Gracillariidae. It is known from Guyana.

References

stalagmitis
Gracillariidae of South America
Moths described in 1915